Suyat (Baybayin: , Hanunó'o: , Buhid:  , Tagbanwa: , Modern Kulitan:  Jawi (Arabic)) is the modern collective name of the indigenous scripts of various ethnolinguistic groups in the Philippines prior to Spanish colonization in the 16th century up to the independence era in the 21st century. The scripts are highly varied; nonetheless, the term was suggested and used by cultural organizations in the Philippines to denote a unified neutral terminology for Philippine indigenous scripts.

Ancient Philippine scripts

Ancient Philippine scripts are various writing systems that developed and flourished in the Philippines around 300 BC. These scripts are related to other Southeast Asian systems of writing that developed from South Indian Brahmi scripts used in Asoka Inscriptions and Pallava Grantha, a type of writing used in the writing of palm leaf books called Grantha script during the ascendancy of the Pallava dynasty about the 5th century, and Arabic scripts that have been used in South East Asian countries. Since the 21st century, these scripts have simply been collectively referred to as "suyat" by various Filipino cultural organizations.

Historical Philippine Indic scripts

Kawi 

The Kawi script originated in Java and was used across much of Maritime Southeast Asia. It is hypothesized to be an ancestor of Baybayin.

The presence of Kawi script in the Philippines is evidenced in the Laguna Copperplate Inscription, the earliest known written document found in the Philippines. It is a legal document with the inscribed date of Shaka era 822, corresponding to April 21, 900 CE. It was written in the Kawi script in a variety of Old Malay containing numerous loanwords from Sanskrit and a few non-Malay vocabulary elements whose origin is ambiguous between Kawi and Old Tagalog. A second example of Kawi script can be seen on the Butuan Ivory Seal, found in the 1970s and dated between the 9th and 12th centuries. It is an ancient seal made of ivory that was found in an archaeological site in Butuan. The seal is inscribed with the word Butwan in stylized Kawi. Declared as a National Cultural Treasure, the Butuan Ivory Seal is now housed at the National Museum of the Philippines.

Baybayin

Baybayin is a script that has historically been widely used in traditional Tagalog domains and in other parts of Luzon and Visayas in the Philippines prior to and during the 16th and 17th centuries. Baybayin is an abugida which uses a system of diacritical marks to associate vowels with consonant symbols. The name Baybayin is Tagalog in origin and is used as an umbrella term that encompasses localized variants known under other names in a number of other major Philippine ethnolinguistic domains, such as Badlit (in Visayas), Kur-itan (in Ilocandia), Basahan (in Bicol), and Kulitan (in Pampanga). Baybayin script continued to be used during the early part of the Spanish colonization of the Philippines until largely being replaced by usage of the Latin alphabet.

An earthenware burial jar found in Batangas, called the "Calatagan Pot," is inscribed with characters strikingly similar to Baybayin, and is claimed to have been inscribed ca. 1300 AD. However, its authenticity has not yet been proven. The University of Santo Tomas Archives in Manila, one of the largest archives in the Philippines, currently possesses the most extant collections of ancient variants of Baybayin script in the world.

The use of the Baybayin was widespread during the 15th century. By the end of 17th century, its use was almost non-existent and its use in public life eventually disappeared by the 18th century. The inability of the script to record the new sounds introduced by the Spaniards, the rapid acquisition of literacy in the Latin script with its concomitant social and material benefits, and the disruption of traditional family activities were the main culprits for the loss of Baybayin script. Buhid, Hanunóo, and Tagbanwa are the only surviving descendants of Baybayin, however their use is confined to poetry and other literary pursuits among its native writers.

Arabic

The Arabic alphabet (or), or Arabic abjad, is the Arabic script as it is codified for writing Arabic. It is written from right to left in a cursive style and includes 28 letters. Most letters have contextual letterforms.

Unlike Baybayin (which is an abugida) and Eskayan (which is a syllabary), the Arabic script is considered an abjad, meaning it only uses consonants. Specifically, it is considered an "impure abjad". As with other impure abjads, such as the Hebrew alphabet, scribes devised means of indicating vowel sounds by separate vowel diacritics later on in the development of the script.

Jawi

Jawi is an Arabic script for writing Tausūg, Malay, Acehnese, Banjarese, Minangkabau, and several other languages in Southeast Asia.

The script became prominent with the spread of Islam, supplanting the earlier writing systems. The Tausugs, Malays, and other groups that use it hold the script in high esteem as a gateway to understanding Islam and its Holy Book, the Quran. The use of Jawi script was a key factor driving the emergence of Malay as the lingua franca of the region, alongside the spread of Islam. It was widely used in Sultanate of Malacca, Sultanate of Johor, Sultanate of Brunei, Sultanate of Sulu, Sultanate of Maguindanao, Sultanate of Pattani, the Sultanate of Aceh to the Sultanate of Ternate in the east as early as the 15th century.

Contemporary suyat scripts

Contemporary suyat include the modern Kulitan script of the Kapampangan people, variants of Baybayin, the Iniskaya script of the Eskaya people, Jawi script, and Kirim script.

Contemporary Philippine Indic scripts

In 1999, four suyat scripts were inscribed in the UNESCO Memory of the World Programme, under the name Philippine Paleographs (Hanunoo, Buid, Tagbanua and Pala’wan). The four scripts, Hanunó'o/Hanunoo, Buhid/Buid, Tagbanwa, and Ibalnan scripts, were recognized by UNESCO as the only existing suyat scripts still used by certain Philippine communities in their daily lives. UNESCO also recognized that the four scripts, along with thirteen other suyat scripts, have existed within the Philippine archipelago since the 10th century AD. The ambahan poetry made with the Hanunó'o/Hanunoo script was also cited. The inscription of the four suyat scripts was the first documentary heritage of the Philippines to be inscribed in the Memory of the World Programme. Computer fonts for these three living scripts are available for IBM and Macintosh platforms, and come into two styles based on actual historical and stylistic samples. PostScript and TrueType fonts as well a concise manual that gives a background of these ancient scripts and a short tutorial on how to write with them are included in each package.

Eskayan

Eskayan script is the constructed script of the auxiliary Eskayan language of the island of Bohol in the Philippines. Like Yugtun and Fox script, it is based on cursive Latin. The script was developed approximately 1920–1937. "Although the script is used for representing Visayan (Cebuano)—a widely used language of the southern Philippines—its privileged role is in the written reproduction of a constructed utopian language, referred to as Eskayan or Bisayan Declarado...  the Eskayan language and its script are used by approximately 550 people for restricted purposes in the southeast of the island of Bohol."

Jawi

The Tausūg language was previously written with the Arabic alphabet. The script used was inspired by the use of Jawi in writing the Malay language. The Arabic script used to write the Tausug language differs in some aspects to the script used for the Arabic language and in the Jawi script used for Malay languages. One of the main differences is in the way that word-initial vowels are written. In Arabic, /in/ is (إن); in Jawi (Malay), it is (ان). In Tausug, it is (ئِن). The Tausug Arabic script utilises the letter yā' with a hamza (ئ) to represent a short vowel. If a kasra (ئِ) is added, it becomes an 'i' sound. If a fatha (ئَ) is added, it becomes an 'a' sound. If a damma (ئُ) is added, it becomes a 'u' sound.

An example of the Arabic alphabet in writing the Tausūg language:
 Latin script – Wayruun tuhan malaingkan Allāh, hi Muhammad ing rasūl sin Allāh
 Arabic script – وَيْـرُٷنْ تُـهَـنْ مَـلَـيِـڠْـكَـن هَالله، هِـمُـحَـمَّـدْ ئِـڠ رَسُـولْ سِـڠ الله
 English translation''' – There is no god but Allah, Muhammad is the Messenger of Allah

National writing system

The "National Script Act"'' went before the House of Representatives of the Republic of the Philippines in 2011. The bill calls for the protection and conservation of Baybayin as the national script of the Philippines. Among its strategies, it aims to promote the Baybayin script by having it inscribed on all locally produced or processed food products.

Due to lack of congressional and senatorial sessions and support, the bill did not pass into law in the 16th Congress. It was refiled in 2016 under the 17th Congress, with little political support.

The Act came before the House again in 2018. According to a press release from the House, the bill "declares there is a need to promote, protect, preserve and conserve "Baybayin" as the National Writing System of the Philippines, using it as a tool for cultural and economic development to create a consciousness, respect and pride for the legacies of Filipino cultural history, heritage and the country's authentic identity."

Calligraphy
The diversity of suyat scripts have also established various calligraphy techniques and styles in the Philippines. Each suyat script has its own suyat calligraphy, although all suyat calligraphy are collectively referred to as Filipino suyat calligraphy for the sake of nationalism. Western-alphabet and Arabic calligraphy, however, are not considered as Filipino suyat calligraphy as the alphabets used did not develop indigenously.

See also 
 Brahmi script
 Kawi script
 Dambana
 Culture of the Philippines
 Art of the Philippines
 Hinduism in the Philippines
 Indosphere
 Greater India
 Calligraphy
 List of India-related topics in the Philippines

References 

Philippine scripts
Writing systems